The Teradaya Incident is the name used for two clashes between samurai during the bakumatsu period. Both of them took place in Teradaya, a ryokan inn in Fushimi, south of Kyōto. The first one, in 1862 (also called the Teradaya Disturbance), was the suppression of Sonnō-jōi followers of the Satsuma domain; it was the first armed rebellion against the shogunate. The second one, in 1866, was a failed attack on Sakamoto Ryōma, the magistrate of Fushimi; it became a popular subject of Japanese books and films.

In 1862 

During the bakumatsu period, the Satsuma domain was divided into two factions: the "progressives", who wanted to overthrow the shogunate and give supreme power to the emperor, and the "moderates", who wanted to forge stronger links between the shogunate and the emperor (the kōbu gattai policy).

Around 60 to 70 samurai, led by Arima Shinshichi and including Ryōma as one of the progressives, met at the Teradaya inn to organize the assassinations of imperial counselor Kujō Hisatada and shogun's Kyoto representative Sakai Tadaaki to sever the relationship between the two powers. Most of the conspirators were from Satsuma. Shimazu Hisamitsu, the daimyo of Satsuma, heard about the meeting and ordered that the conspirators be brought to the Satsuma residence in Kyoto or killed if they refuse. In fact, he was following the imperial decree ordering him to take care of the rōnin problem in Kyoto.

As it was improbable that the ishin shishi would come without a fight, the daimyo sent nine Satsuma samurai under the leadership of Narahara Shigeru to attack the inn. After a short but bloody clash, eight rebels (including Arima himself) were dead, while the nine attackers had only one dead and two wounded. The remaining conspirators gave up and went to the residence. It was the end of the first armed conspiracy against the shogunate.

In 1866 

On 9 March 1866, the agents of the shogunate raided the inn to arrest or assassinate Sakamoto Ryōma. He was saved by his future wife Narasaki Ryo (Oryo), who rushed naked from the bathroom to warn him. Ryoma defended himself with a Smith & Wesson; he was injured but escaped from the inn together with his bodyguard Miyoshi Shinzo and hid in a storehouse at a nearby canal, where Satsuma samurai rescued him.

The original Teradaya inn was burnt down in the Battle of Toba-Fushimi in 1868. It was rebuilt as a tourist attraction.

References  

Some of the above information has been taken from the French and German Wikipedia articles on the subject.

1862 in Japan
1866 in Japan
Conflicts in 1862
Conflicts in 1866
March 1866 events
19th-century rebellions
Rebellions in Japan
Bakumatsu
History of Kyoto
Failed assassination attempts in Japan
Attacks on hotels in Asia